TAP Air Portugal is the currently state-owned flag carrier airline of Portugal, headquartered at Lisbon Airport which also serves as its hub. TAP – Transportes Aéreos Portugueses – has been a member of the Star Alliance since 2005 and operates on average 2,500 flights a week to 90 destinations in 34 countries worldwide. The company has a fleet of 100 aircraft, all of which are manufactured by Airbus with the exception of 22 aircraft manufactured by Embraer and ATR, operating on behalf of the regional airline TAP Express.

The airline was established on 14 March 1945 and began commercial services on 19 September 1946. Having been founded as a national institution, the airline was privatised for the first time in its history during 1953. Throughout its existence, TAP has alternated interminably between public and private ownership.

In 1965 it bought its first Boeing-built jetliner, the 707. In 1967, the airline became the first in Europe to exclusively operate jets. In 1979, the airline underwent a modernisation programme, changing its name to TAP Air Portugal. By the end of the decade, the airline operated a fleet of 32 modern airliners that served in excess of 40 destinations on four continents. During the 1980s, the fleet of Boeing 707s and 747s was replaced with Lockheed L-1011 TriStars and Airbus A310s on long-haul routes. In 1983, TAP started operating its first Boeing 737-200s on short-haul routes. By the late 1990s, TAP had sold its Boeing 727s and 737s, replacing them with Airbus A319, A320 and A321 aircraft. Its Lockheed L-1011 TriStars were also replaced by Airbus A340s. These changes led to TAP becoming ever since an Airbus-only operator and exclusive customer of the European aircraft manufacturer. 

The current Portuguese government has unveiled plans to reprivatize the airline. The Portuguese Court of Audits has been highly critical of the public intervention on TAP. The U.S. Department of Transportation announced 'historic' enforcement actions against six airlines, including TAP: $126.5 million in required refunds paid and a $1.1 million penalty, 'for extreme delays in providing refunds'.

History

Establishment and early operations

On 14 March 1945, the airline was founded as state-owned company with the name Transportes Aéreos Portugueses (Portuguese Air Transportation) and operated under the jurisdiction of the Portuguese Civil Aviation Office. Later that same year, it took delivery of its first aircraft, a pair of Douglas DC-3s. The airline began commercial services on 19 September 1946, performing an inaugural flight from Lisbon to Madrid, carrying a total of 11 passengers on one of its DC-3s. On 31 December 1946, TAP Air Portugal began its Linha Aérea Imperial, a twelve-stop colonial service including Luanda, Angola and Lourenço Marques (now Maputo), Mozambique. It covered 24.450 km within 15 days (both ways), making it the longest air service operated with twin-engine airliners at that time. To suit the tropical conditions at most of these destinations, a special uniform was adopted, comprising khaki shirts with either skirts or shorts.

In 1947, the airline launched its first domestic services, commencing a route between Lisbon and Porto, as well as another international route between São Tomé and London. That same year, a total of four Douglas DC-4 Skymasters were purchased; these reportedly remained in the airline's service as late as 1960. These were used on the routes to Africa and to major European destinations, including London. During 1948, new services to Seville and Paris were launched.

Privatization
During 1953, the airline was privatised for the first time in its history, reorganising from a public service to a public limited company (plc); that same year, it commenced new services to Tangier and Casablanca. During late 1955, several Lockheed Super Constellation four-engined pressurised airliners were acquired; these were immediately introduced on the TAP African scheduled services to Luanda and Lourenço Marques. The Super Constellation was credited with noticeably reducing flight times over prior airliners on its routes.

During 1955, the airline broke new ground with a successful long-distance experimental transatlantic trip to Rio de Janeiro, Brazil. On this flight, as a passenger, was the Portuguese aviator and cartographer Carlos Viegas Gago Coutinho. By the end of the decade, the firm had attained several milestones, including the carriage of 64,000 passengers, its fleet performing 10,000 hours of flight, a route network spanning 14,000 km, while also employing over 1,000 members of staff.

Beginning in 1960, TAP Air Portugal launched Rio de Janeiro as its first destination in Brazil, in a jointly-operated air service named "Voo da Amizade" ("Friendship Flight") with Panair do Brasil (1960–1965) and Varig (1965–1967). A route from Lisbon to Goa, a 19-hour flight with five stopovers, was added to the network during 1961.

The jet era – mid-1960s onwards

During July 1962, TAP entered the jet era, having procured an initial batch of three French-built Sud Aviation Caravelle, an early twin-jet airliner. These were first operated upon the airline's most competitive European routes. That same year, new services were launched between Lisbon and Las Palmas, as well as Santa Maria in the Azores. During 1963, additional European routes, serving Geneva, Munich, and Frankfurt, commenced.

On 19 June 1964, the one-millionth passenger was carried by the airline, broadly 18 years following the commencement of operations. During the following year, TAP procured its first Boeing-built jetliner, the 707. Two years later, it would be followed by the short-haul Boeing 727. On 17 June 1966, TAP operated its first sole flight to Brazil, one of its 707s landed at Galeão Airport in Rio de Janeiro at precisely at the same time and on the same day as when the hydroplane Santa Cruz moored in Guanabara Bay in 1922, when Sacadura Cabral and Gago Coutinho made their historic South Atlantic crossing. The route to Brazil was inaugurated.

In 1967, the airline achieved a milestone: it became the first European airline to fly exclusively with jets. In 1969, service to New York City via Santa Maria Island began; two years later, Boston was added to the New York service. During 1971, the airline opted to relocate its headquarters to Lisbon Airport. In the following year, TAP received the first of an initial batch of four Boeing 747-200s. In 1974, it became the first European airline to perform complete overhauls of the Pratt & Whitney JT9D turbofan engine, which powered early versions of the Boeing 747 amongst other aircraft. By the end of the decade, the airline operated a fleet of 32 modern airliners that served in excess of 40 destinations on four continents.

In 1974, TAP introduced a new computerised system handling reservations, load control, and check-in, known as Tapmatic. and became the first European airline to carry out major comprehensive overhauls of Boeing 747 engines. By the end of 1974, TAP had carried more than 1.5 million passengers, flown 68,210 hours over a network of almost 103,000 kilometres and had a staff of over 9,000.

Nationalization
Following the 25 April 1974 revolution, Portugal was caught up in the wave of nationalisations during the following year and TAP was no exception, thus becoming a state-owned corporation during 1975.

Following the independence of both Angola and Mozambique, the importance of the African market decreased tremendously; due to decreasing passenger demand, two of the 747s were sold on during 1976. During 1979, the airline launched a modernisation programme; amongst other brand changes, its name changed to TAP Air Portugal, which was deemed to be easier for international customers to recognise.

Fleet modernisation and expansion 

In 1980, TAP launched a new service between Lisbon and Barcelona; operations were also expanded between Milan and Rome. During the following year, Teresa Carvalho became the airline's first female pilot; that same year, its first in-flight magazine, Atlantis, was launched. During 1985, the airline reportedly carried two million passengers within a single year for the first time; a museum dedicated to the airline was also opened on 14 March 1985 to mark the company's fortieth anniversary.

During the 1980s, the fleet of Boeing 707s and 747s was replaced with Lockheed L-1011 TriStars and Airbus A310s on long-haul routes. During 1983, TAP started operating its first Boeing 737-200s on short-haul routes. In 1988, it launched a new fare-calculation and ticketing system. That same year, it also became the first airline to harness land-to-air datalinks via a satellite connection.

During 1985, TAP established its charter subsidiary Air Atlantis, providing leisure flights to most European cities, which operated Boeing 707, Boeing 727 and Boeing 737 jetliners..

During 1991, the airline reportedly carried three million passengers that year for the first time. In 1993, TAP began flying to Tel Aviv. In 1994, TAP signed for a code sharing arrangement with Delta Air Lines for North Atlantic service; this agreement came to an end during 2005. 1996 saw the introduction of service to Boston via Terceira Island, the inauguration of service to Macau and the launch of TAP's website. In 1997, service began to Punta Cana and Bangkok; however, flights to Bangkok and Macau were discontinued during the following year.

By the late 1990s, TAP had expanded its fleet by selling its older Boeing 727s and Boeing 737s and replacing them with Airbus A319, A320 and A321 aircraft. Its TriStars were sold to Air Luxor and were replaced with Airbus A340s beginning in 1995. These changes led to TAP becoming an Airbus-only operator, which it claimed to have also made its fleet more economical and versatile. Furthermore, the airline had initiated a program of continuous cabin modernisation and renewal with the aim of implementing ever greater levels of service. In 1999, TAP introduced its first Blue Flights, upon which smoking was banned.

In 1997, a strategic alliance was formed between TAP and Swissair. Within the scope of this agreement, a team of professional managers arrived at TAP, led by the Brazilian :pt:Fernando Pinto. Part of the agreement would lead to Swissair buying a 34% stake of TAP. Also, TAP became a member of Qualiflyer, the frequent-flyer program led by the Swiss flag carrier. Due to financial difficulties, the Swiss company ends up not buying the agreed shares of TAP Air Portugal, unilaterally revoking the partnership agreement which led to unexpected costs for the Portuguese airline in 2000. This revocation culminated in legal action being taken by TAP against Swissair.

Start of the twenty-first century 

During February 2005, TAP Air Portugal was re-branded as TAP Portugal. On 14 March 2005, TAP became a member of the multinational Star Alliance, which was also the same day on which the company celebrated its 60th anniversary. TAP also ended its code-sharing agreement with Delta Air Lines and began a new agreement with United, as part of its membership in the Star Alliance. Under this agreement, United's code (UA) is placed on TAP Air Portugal's transatlantic flights and some African flights, and TAP Air Portugal's code (TP) is placed on United flights.

In 2006, TAP Air Portugal signed a deal with Espírito Santo International for the acquisition of 99.81% of the Portuguese regional airline Portugália. Furthermore, it started a code-sharing agreement with US Airways on all routes between Portugal and the United States with connecting services out of Newark and Philadelphia.

In 2007, TAP Air Portugal was awarded by NATO as the Best Engine/Aircraft Source of Repair for the NATO AWACS Maintenance Program. TAP Air Portugal has complete maintenance and overhaul bases in Portugal (Lisbon) and Brazil (Rio de Janeiro and Porto Alegre) and has specialised line maintenance stations in three continents: 4 in Portugal, 8 in Brazil, and 1 in Angola. It started scheduled flights to Moscow, Warsaw and Helsinki, in June 2009.

After deciding to outsource its Passenger Service System in 2008, TAP migrated its reservation and inventory systems to the Altéa system managed by Amadeus. Before the migration to Altéa, TAP was using a system derived from Delta Air Lines called Tapmatic, in use since 1972.

During 2010, TAP introduced two new routes to Africa: Marrakesh and Algiers, the latter was discontinued in 2017. The launch of these new routes highlighted the carrier airline reinforcement of its growth strategy for Africa, which is an important segment in the network where the airline has continually expanded since 2001, going from 236,000 to 541,000 passengers, an increase of more than 129%. In 2011, new long range routes to both Miami and Porto Alegre were introduced.

Reprivatization 

In order to obtain its three-year national bailout, Portugal was forced to sell its interests in several companies, including the state-run airline. Several international operators were drawn by the airline's strategic position, but on 18 October 2012, the Portuguese government announced a sole potential bidder for the privatized national carrier: South American consortium Synergy Aerospace, owner of Colombian airline Avianca. Portuguese financial daily Dinheiro Vivo indicated that the government would suspend privatization negotiations if German Efromovich's Synergy Aerospace bid was not approved.

On 21 March 2014, the airline announced it would purchase two ATR 42-600s for subsidiary Portugália, replacing the smaller Beechcraft 1900D previously operated by PGA Express.

The Portuguese government planned to sell its controlling stake in the flag carrier to one or more large investors in a relaunch of the privatisation in 2014. It intended to sell a 66% stake in the airline, with 5% of that set aside for its 7,500 staff. Among known bidders were South American businessman German Efromovich, whose 2012 bid for TAP failed to meet the initial conditions; a consortium formed by American businessman Frank Lorenzo and Portuguese entrepreneur Miguel Pais do Amaral; the American Brazilian businessman David Neeleman, founder of JetBlue in the United States and Azul in Brazil; and finally Globalia, the parent company of Air Europa.

In May 2015, a pilot strike lasting over a week led to the cancellation of around 3,000 TAP Air Portugal flights.

In June 2015, the Portuguese government decided to sell the TAP Air Portugal Group, owner of TAP Air Portugal, to the Atlantic Gateway consortium formed by partners David Neeleman and Humberto Pedrosa, who took control of 61% of the capital of the flag carrier. On the memorandum signed by the new owner, TAP Air Portugal had to keep Portugal as the airline's main hub for a minimum of 30 years. The consortium that secured the company's privatization in June 2015 promised to buy 53 new Airbus aircraft for the airline; new orders included 14 wide-body A330s and 39 narrow-body A320-family aircraft.

Renationalization 

In October 2015, a new left-wing government sought to return majority control of the airline to the state through renationalization, and in February 2016 signed a deal with the private consortium stating that the company was 50% owned by the Portuguese state, 45% by the Atlantic Gateway Consortium and 5% of available shares to TAP collaborators and employees.

On 14 January 2016, TAP Air Portugal announced that subsidiary Portugália Airlines would be rebranded TAP Express by 27 March 2016, as part of further restructuring measures within the group. That same day, it announced that the entire Portugália fleet would be replaced with new aircraft by July 2016, receiving a livery similar to TAP Air Portugal's. A downsizing of the carrier network also took place that month, with TAP announcing the end of long-haul flights to Panama City, Manaus and Bogota as well as European connections to Hanover and Zagreb.

TAP Air Portugal planned to promote Portugal as a tourism destination in the United States, and Lisbon as a gateway into Europe for North American travellers, and in February 2016 announced the return of New York's John F. Kennedy International and Boston's Logan International as daily non-stop destinations from Lisbon. The Boston service started on June 11 and the new JFK daily flights on July 1, both operated with new Airbus A330-200s received in June of the same year from Azul Brazilian Airlines. These two new routes reinforced the airline's presence in the American market, along with service to Miami from Lisbon and Newark from Lisbon and Porto. Taken together, the amount of TAP Air Portugal flights to the US grew to 30 per week.

TAP expanded its network in 2017, adding 10 routes, some of which were previously operated by the airline: Abidjan, Ivory Coast; Alicante and Las Palmas, Spain; Bucharest, Romania; Budapest, Hungary; Cologne and Stuttgart, Germany; Fez, Morocco; Lomé, Togo; London City Airport, United Kingdom and Toronto, Canada.

In March 2017, Miguel Antunes Frasquilho, president and CEO of AICEP Portugal Global, was selected to be TAP Air Portugal's new chairman of the board.

On 14 September 2017, TAP Portugal was renamed TAP Air Portugal, going back to the name used between 1979 and 2005.

In 2020, amidst the COVID-19 Crisis, the European Commission approved the Portuguese government’s plan to bail out the flag carrier, paving the way for the first tranche of €1.2 billion ($1.36 billion) government loan to help it through the crisis and a restructuring plan including employee downsizing and sale of aircraft.

On 14 November 2022, the U.S. Department of Transportation announced historic enforcement actions against six airlines, including TAP, $126.5 million in required refunds paid and a $1.1 million penalty, 'for extreme delays in providing refunds.' The Department expects to issue additional orders assessing civil penalties for consumer protection violations this calendar year.

Intended Reprivatization

The Portuguese governing majority in Parliament has since announced, in September 2022, it wants to reprivatize the company once again and is awaiting the right market moment to proceed with the plan. According to it, the Portuguese government wants to conclude the sale within the first semester of 2023.  The immediate previous renationalization which currently remains was a prominent political promise from the first mandate of the current executive, within the argument that TAP was a strategic company for the country's economy and as such must be public. The renationalization received strong criticism from the Portuguese Court of Audits which affirmed it would not be efficient and would burden taxpayers in various millions of euros. The injection of Portuguese taxpayer's money was € 337.500.000,00 directly and € 615,000,000.00 indirectly on debts' guarantees for the company.  In October 2022 the Portuguese Court of Audits again highly criticized the taxpayers' injection of money into TAP stating in its Assessment on the General State Account for 2021 that it should have been accounted as an effective expense and not as a financial asset: 'the classification of financial assets, with no expression in actual expenditure but with a significant impact on debt, which essentially seek to pursue social and public policy objectives and are not intended to produce a financial return'. Thus considering it an unprofitable public investment, with sovereign debt risk association for the State and consequentely menacing taxpayers' legitimate interests.

Former Portuguese Infrastructure Minister Pedro Nuno Santos resigned on 29 December 2022 after a backlash over news of a half million euros severance payment to former TAP executive Alexandra Reis, then Treasury Secretary of State, who resigned a day before from government. On March 6 2023, the Portuguese government fired the airline’s Chief Executive Officer (CEO) and Chairman after a damaging report from the Portuguese General Inspectorate of Finances.

Corporate affairs and identity

TAP has its head office in Building 25 on the grounds of Humberto Delgado Airport in Santa Maria dos Olivais, Lisbon.

Subsidiaries
TAP Air Portugal's subsidiaries are:

Up until the end of 2016, TAP Air Portugal had a 51% stake in Lojas Francas de Portugal (LFP), a retail joint-venture created in 1995 between the flag carrier and Dufry. LFP is present in Lisbon, Porto, Faro, Madeira and Azores, with over 30 stores, and is also present on board of TAP Air Portugal with its "On Air" shopping magazine. Its stake in the company was sold to Vinci, the owner of ANA Aeroportos de Portugal.

TAP Cargo
TAP Cargo is the freight branch of TAP Air Portugal. It does not operate its own cargo aircraft, but sells freight capacity aboard TAP's passenger flights and also maintains five scheduled all-cargo routes utilising other airlines:

 London Heathrow Airport operated by European Air Transport with a Boeing 757
 Frankfurt Airport operated by MNG Airlines with an Airbus A300
 Cologne Bonn Airport operated by MNG Airlines with an Airbus A300
 Brussels Airport operated by Royal Jordanian with an Airbus A310
 Dakar Airport

TAP Cargo also operates Lisbon-Luanda all-cargo non-regular flights, in an Avient Aviation DC-10F, a Girjet 747-200F, and other leased aircraft.

Business Trends

Branding and identity 
Beginning on 28 February 2011 TAP began airing its "TAP With Arms Wide Open" (TAP de Braços Abertos) campaign, featuring its new slogan. Three singers, the Brazilian singer Roberta de Sá, the Portuguese singer Mariza, and the Angolan singer Paulo Flores starred in a music video with the song "Arms Wide Open." The music video featured TAP employees. The inclusion of the three singers was intended to highlight the proximity between peoples in the Lusophone countries.

In 2005, TAP unveiled its current logo and livery, to coincide with its Star Alliance membership, during the airline's 60th anniversary. It also saw the name change from TAP Air Portugal, introduced in the 1970s, to TAP Portugal. On 14 September 2017, TAP returned to its previous name. The first logo dates back to 1945 when the airline was founded. It consisted of a blue wing with the acronym TAP written to its left.

Museum 
The TAP museum unit was created in 1978, but it only opened officially on 14 March 1985 as part of the company's 40th-anniversary celebrations. Its venue was at the company's head office on the grounds of Lisbon airport. Due to space limitations, on 29 January 2010, the new premises of the Museu do Ar (Air Museum), in the municipality of Sintra, opened to the public. This extensive museum is the result of a three-way partnership between airport operator Ana-Aeroportos, the Portuguese Air Force and TAP. The collection on display recounts the history of military and civil aviation in Portugal. Visitors can see 40 aircraft, including a TAP Douglas DC-3, simulators, engines, and other exhibits. A panel of photographs in the main hangar tells the story of 100 years of aviation in Portugal.

Awards 
In 2007, TAP Air Portugal was awarded by NATO as the Best Engine/Aircraft Source of Repair for the NATO AWACS Maintenance Program and has been distinguished with the highest maintenance and overhaul practice awards from Airbus Industries in 1996, 2000, 2003, and 2005, being certified for full aircraft, engine and component maintenance and overhaul by the FAA, EASA, and several other important certification entities and aircraft manufacturers (Airbus, Boeing, and Embraer).

In 2010, TAP Air Portugal was awarded the "World's Best Airline Award" by British Condé Nast Traveler magazine, after being rated for its excellence in previous years, and was rated as the "Best Airline to South America" by the World Travel Awards in 2009 and 2010, with nominations for "Europe's Leading Airline" and "Europe's Leading Business Class" in 2007, 2009 and 2010. TAP Air Portugal has also consistently achieved high ranks and various awards from specialized air travel publications such as Skytrax and Publituris due to the company's excellence in service and performance. In recent years, TAP Air Portugal has been consecutively elected World's Leading Airline to Africa and South America by the World Travel Awards (WTA), considered the "Oscars" of the world travel industry.

In the December 2017/January 2018 edition of the magazine Monocles Travel Top 50, an annual list, selected by the magazine's editors, awarded Portugal's TAP airline the accolade of "most handsome crew."

Destinations 

As of June 2017, TAP Air Portugal serves 87 destinations in 34 countries across Europe, Africa, North America and South America, with some domestic, European and African destinations being operated by TAP Express.

TAP Air Portugal is the leading European airline flying to Brazil, offering more destinations from its hub in Lisbon than any other European airline. Many Europeans transit through Portugal to fly to Brazil due to a large number of slots TAP holds on the South American country.

In March 2016, TAP Air Portugal began an air shuttle service, designated "Ponte Aérea", to connect Lisbon and Porto's airports with flights every hour adding up to 18 round-trip flights. It is operated by White Airways on behalf of the regional brand TAP Express. As of 2019, TAP Air Portugal will launch 15 new routes as well as receive 15 new aircraft.

Codeshare agreements
TAP Air Portugal has codeshare agreements with the following airlines:

 Aegean Airlines
 airBaltic
 Air Canada
 Air China
 Air India
 All Nippon Airways
 Austrian Airlines
 Azores Airlines
 Azul Brazilian Airlines
 Beijing Capital Airlines
 Brussels Airlines
 Croatia Airlines
 EgyptAir
 El Al
 Emirates
 Ethiopian Airlines
 Etihad Airways
 Finnair
 Gol Transportes Aéreos
 ITA Airways
 JetBlue
 LAM Mozambique Airlines
 LOT Polish Airlines
 Lufthansa
 Luxair
 Nordica
 S7 Airlines
 Singapore Airlines
 South African Airways
 Swiss International Air Lines
 Thai Airways
 Turkish Airlines
 Ukraine International Airlines
 United Airlines

Fleet

Current fleet
, TAP Air Portugal operates an all-Airbus fleet consisting of the following aircraft:

TAP Air Portugal became the launch customer of the Airbus A330neo in November 2018 when the airframer delivered to the airline the first aircraft of the type, on lease from Avolon. TAP ordered 21 of these aircraft, of which 10 are directly ordered from Airbus and the rest will be leased. They also estimated to have 133 aircraft in the fleet by 2025 including TAP Express.

Fleet development
Before its current fleet, TAP Air Portugal had operated the following aircraft types:

Services

Lounges
TAP Air Portugal offers two different lounges at Lisbon Airport, the TAP Premium Lounge, available for Victoria Gold Winners, Star Alliance Gold members and passengers flying on business class on Star Alliance flights, while Victoria Silver Winners only have access to the Blue Lounge, contracted with the handling subsidiary Groundforce.

Cabins

The aircraft are divided into a two-class cabin: business class (branded as tap|executive) and economy classes (tap|plus, tap|classic, tap|basic and tap|discount). TAP Air Portugal does not offer first-class services. On the medium-haul fleet of Airbus A319, Airbus A320 and Airbus A321 aircraft, both cabins have been retrofitted with new leather seats. The executive class offers better privacy than economy class, and more meal options. On the long-haul fleet of Airbus A330, A330neo and A321LR aircraft, the cabin is divided into a two-class layout. The economy class of the new Airbus A330s, A330neos and A321LRs are equipped with modern individual LCDs with a touchscreen and a complete IFE. The entire fleet of Airbus A340 economy class was refurbished during 2013, adding a new seat design and a new in-flight entertainment system. In business class, seats are capable of turning into lie-flat beds. New Airbus A330 aircraft are also fitted with extra functions.

TAP's in-flight magazine is named UP and is available on board, as a fully responsive website (compatible with desktops, smart phones and tablets), and as a freely downloadable application for Apple's iPad.

Airspace by Airbus 
The Portuguese airline will also be the first to take a new cabin layout called "Airspace". The design allows airlines to add more seats.

Frequent-flyer program
TAP Air Portugal current loyalty program is Miles & Go which replaced an earlier program called Victoria. These are programs which awards members miles based on the distance travelled, ticket fare and class of service.
As part of Star Alliance, miles can be earned as well from Star Alliance and other eligible partners. Membership in the frequent-flier programme is free. The Miles&Go Programme is divided into three tiers:
 The basic tier, with no mileage requirements.
 TAP Miles&Go Silver (Star Alliance Silver), with a requirement of 30,000 Status Miles or 25 segments flown within one year.
 TAP Miles&Go Gold (Star Alliance Gold), with a requirement of 70,000 Status Miles or 50 segments flown within one year.
The programme does have a feature whereby some of the miles can be converted from regular award miles.

Accidents and incidents
According to the JACDEC Airliner Safety Report released in January 2021 TAP ranks 22nd on the list of 100 largest airlines measured by their revenue passenger performance in RPK’s.

 On 27 January 1948, a Douglas C-47A-50-DL (DC-3) (registered as CS-TDB) was conducting a training flight over Lisbon in adverse weather when the plane lost control and crashed in Monte da Caparica. All 3 people on board were killed.
 TAP Air Portugal Flight 425: the crash of Flight 425 at Madeira Airport on 19 November 1977 remains TAP's deadliest accident. Flight 425 was flying to Madeira Airport from Brussels via Lisbon. The Boeing 727 crashed while landing on runway 24 in heavy rain. Before the crash, the pilot had made two unsuccessful attempts to land and had decided to make one more attempt. The plane crashed onto a beach at the end of the runway, splitting into two pieces and bursting into flames. Of the 164 people aboard, 131 were killed and 33 survived. It is the second-deadliest airplane accident in Portugal (after Independent Air Flight 1851). The crash prompted officials to explore ways of extending the short runway on Madeira. Because of the height of the runway relative to the beach below, an extension was deemed very difficult and too expensive to perform at the time. A  extension was built between 1983 and 1986.
 TAP Air Portugal Flight 1492: On 2 September 2022, engine 2 of Flight 1492, an Airbus A320-251N, struck a motorcycle that crossed the runway at Ahmed Sékou Touré International Airport in Conakry, Guinea during the plane’s landing roll. Both riders on the motorcycle perished, however everyone on board the plane were unharmed. Engine 2 of the plane was damaged from the collision.

References

Notes

Citations

Bibliography

 Chillon, J., French Postwar Transport Aircraft, 1980, Air-Britain (Historians) Ltd, . 
 Marson, Peter J, The Lockheed Constellation Series, 1982, Air-Britain (Historians) Ltd, .

External links

 Official website
 TAP Corporate
 TAP Victoria
 Up Magazine

 
Airlines of Portugal
Association of European Airlines members
Airlines for Europe
Airlines established in 1945
Government-owned companies of Portugal
Portuguese brands
Star Alliance
Companies based in Lisbon
Portuguese companies established in 1945